Sparky Animation is a Singapore animation company. The company produces 3D animation for home videos, television series, digital games, mobile and Internet content, and movies for worldwide markets. Sparky Animation develops original contents and Intellectual properties, and merchandises them globally through international licences. Their research department also develops CGI production tools and systems. The company also distributes in Asia material developed by other companies.

History
Sparky Animation commenced operations in 2006 in Singapore, where the government provided subsidies for the entertainment industry. The television series Dinosaur Train was co-produced with The Jim Henson Company.

In 2014, the company had about 120 employees. It had a subsidiary company in Subang Jaya, Malaysia. and production facilities in India.

Productions/Collaborations
Help! I'm a Fish (2006)
VeggieTales: Tomato Sawyer and Huckleberry Larry's Big River Rescue (2008)
Dinosaur Train Season 1 (2009-2010)
Mr Moon (2010)
Dinosaur Train Season 2 (2011)
Jack Season 1 (2011)
Fleabag Monkeyface (2012) 
One Stormy Night (2012)
The Disrespectoids (2013-2014)
Jack Season 2 (2014)
Dinosaur Train Season 3 (2014)
Dinosaur Train Season 4 (2016)Dinosaur Train: Adventure Island (2021)Ruff Ruff, Tweet and Dave (2015)

Awards/NominationsDinosaur Train, a coproduction between The Jim Henson Company and Sparky Animation, received the highest viewership in PBS' history. It has also been selected by Hollywood's People Magazine as the Top Kids' Show. The toys developed from Dinosaur Train were nominated under the 'Toy of the Year' award category by the Toy Industry Association, in 2010. At the 38th Annual Daytime Entertainment Emmy Awards, Dinosaur Train was nominated for Outstanding Children's Animated Program.Jack, a co-production with Groupe PVP Canada was nominated in the Best Animated Series category at the 27th Prix Gémeaux 2012. In May 2013, Jack won the Award of Excellence for the Best Animated Television Program (Ages 6 to 8) at the Youth Media Alliance in Canada.One Stormy Night'' was nominated for the Best 3D Animated Programme award at the 2012 Asian Television Awards.

References

 MDA Animation Brochure,

External links
 

Animation studios
Companies of Singapore
Singaporean brands